Distant is an upcoming American science fiction comedy film directed by Josh Gordon and Will Speck from a screenplay by Spenser Cohen. It stars Anthony Ramos, Naomi Scott, and Zachary Quinto. It was shot in the midst of the COVID-19 pandemic in Budapest, Hungary. During post-production, editing was completed by Gregory Plotkin and the musical score was composed by Steven Price. The film is scheduled to be released in the United States by Universal Pictures.

Premise
The spaceship of asteroid miner Andy gets struck, crash landing him on an alien planet where he contends with his AI survival suit. Losing oxygen, he connects with fellow crew member Naomi via radio, who is trapped inside her escape pod, leading him to go search and rescue her.

Cast
 Anthony Ramos as Andy Ramirez
 Naomi Scott as Naomi Calloway
 Zachary Quinto as the voice of Andy's AI survival suit
 Kristofer Hivju as Dwayne

Production
On February 21, 2019, Amblin Partners announced it had bought Distant, a spec script by Spenser Cohen. In August 2019, it was reported Josh Gordon and Will Speck would direct the film, with Brian Kavanaugh-Jones, Fred Berger, and Anna Halberg attached as producers. In December 2019, Anthony Ramos joined the cast. Rachel Brosnahan was cast in February 2020, but later dropped out due to scheduling conflicts; she was replaced by Naomi Scott in August 2020. Filming began in Budapest, Hungary, on September 21, 2020. As a result of the COVID-19 pandemic, the cast and crew followed a number of safety protocols, including "extensive sanitization" procedures, wearing face masks, and social distancing. In October 2020, it was reported Kristofer Hivju would also star. Filming concluded on November 13, 2020. By May 2021, the film was still in post-production. Steven Price composed the musical score for the film. In July 2021, Zachary Quinto was confirmed as part of the cast.

Release
Distant is scheduled to be theatrically released by Universal Pictures. It was originally scheduled for March 11, 2022, September 16, 2022, and later January 27, 2023, before being quietly pulled from Universal's release schedule.

References

External links
 
 
 

2023 comedy-drama films
2023 science fiction films
2020s English-language films
2020s science fiction comedy-drama films
American science fiction comedy-drama films
DreamWorks Pictures films
Films impacted by the COVID-19 pandemic
Films directed by Will Speck and Josh Gordon
Films scored by Steven Price
Films shot in Budapest
Films set on fictional planets
Films with screenplays by Spenser Cohen
Universal Pictures films
Upcoming English-language films
2020s American films